Ponna is a comune (municipality) in the Province of Como in the Italian region Lombardy, located about  north of Milan and about  north of Como.

Ponna borders the following municipalities: Claino con Osteno, Colonno, Laino, Ossuccio, Porlezza, Sala Comacina.

Demographic evolution

References

Cities and towns in Lombardy